The Trade Expansion Act of 1962 (codified at ) is an American trade law.

Section 232 of the Act permits the President to impose tariffs based on a recommendation by the U.S. Secretary of Commerce if "an article is being imported into the United States in such quantities or under such circumstances as to threaten or impair the national security." This section was used only in 1979 and 1982, and had not been invoked since the creation of the World Trade Organization in 1995, until President Trump cited it on March 8, 2018 to impose tariffs on steel and aluminum.

History
In 1962, Congress granted the President of the United States unprecedented authority to negotiate tariff reductions of up to 80%. It paved the way for the Kennedy Round of General Agreement on Tariffs and Trade (GATT) negotiations, concluding on June 30, 1967, the last day before expiration of the Act.

On April 27, 2017, President Donald Trump ordered a review of the aluminum imports and threats to national security under the Trade Expansion Act of 1962. On March 8, 2018, President Trump signed an order to impose the tariffs on steel and aluminum under Section 232 of the Act and citing "national security" grounds.

On May 23, 2018, President Trump "instructed Secretary Ross to consider initiating a Section 232 investigation into imports of automobiles, including trucks, and automotive parts to determine their effects on America’s national security.  Core industries such as automobiles and automotive parts are critical to our strength as a Nation."

In mid-February 2019, Commerce Department Secretary Wilbur Ross delivered a confidential report to President Trump which concluded the Department's investigation under Section 232, that there was a legal rationale for the imposition of steep tariffs on the import of foreign automobiles, as these imports—like steel and aluminum—posed a threat to U.S. national security. According to a March 20, 2019 article in Politico, the proposed tariffs could be as high as 25%. Politico also reported that as of March 20, the requests by the Chair of the Senate Finance Committee—Chuck Grassley (R-Iowa) to access a copy of the confidential report, had been denied. The deadline for Trump's decision on the imposition of the tariffs is in mid-May, ninety days after the report's release.

See also
 Trade Act of 1974
 Smoot–Hawley Tariff Act

Notes

References

1962 in American law
1962 in American politics
United States federal trade legislation
1962 in international relations
Presidency of John F. Kennedy
October 1962 events in the United States